Thelma Pressman (April 10, 1921 – August 10, 2010, Rancho Mirage, California) was a pioneering microwave cooking consultant, product development consultant, and cookbook author. In 1969 she opened the first microwave cooking school in the United States. She was the author of several microwave cookbooks and was a regular columnist for Bon Appétit magazine from 1978 to 1982. After her retirement to the Palm Springs area, she was a founder of the Palm Springs chapter of Les Dames d'Escoffier International and led restaurant tours throughout the Coachella Valley. She was often called "the Julia Child of microwave cooking".

Biography
Pressman studied microwave technology at California Community Colleges in 1967. In 1969 she founded the first microwave cooking school in the United States in Encino, California. The Microwave Cooking Center became an industry test kitchen in which products were evaluated and cookware and recipes were developed for the nascent microwave industry.

Pressman was a consultant for Amana Corporation from 1968 to 1976 and Director of Consumer Education and Services for Sanyo Electric Co. from 1977 to 1987. In the latter position, she assisted in new product development, gave seminars nationwide, and contributed to the development of more than 100 microwave cookbooks and instruction manuals.

Pressman wrote hundreds of articles on microwave cooking for newspapers and magazines. She was a regular columnist for Bon Appétit magazine from 1978 to 1982. She also produced and hosted a live 30-minute TV show on microwave cooking called Fun Time Cooking. Her The Art of Microwave Cooking was selected by the Library of Congress for the Microwave Talking Cookbook for the Blind.

Memberships
Pressman was a member of the Electrical Woman's Round Table, serving as that group's 1977 president, the American Women in Radio and Television, and the International Association of Cooking Professionals.

Pressman was a founding member of the Palm Springs chapter of Les Dames d'Escoffier International, an organization of women leaders in food, beverage and hospitality. From 1991 to 2005 she ran a popular "Restaurant Tour of the Desert", hosting weekly dinners for 25 to 100 locals and tourists at restaurants throughout the Coachella Valley.

Personal life
Pressman was married to Morris (Mo) Pressman for 65 years until his death in 2005. They had two adopted sons, Paul and Rick.

She died on August 10, 2010, at the age of 89, and was buried in Riverside National Cemetery in Riverside, California, next to her husband Mo, who was a veteran of the US Army.

Bibliography

References

External links

Bon Appétit Magazine featuring Thelma Pressman: How to Cook in a Microwave: The 'Best' Advice from Bon Appétit, 1978–1982

American cookbook writers
American food writers
Burials at Riverside National Cemetery
American television chefs
People from Rancho Mirage, California
Writers from Palm Springs, California
1921 births
2010 deaths
Women cookbook writers
American women chefs
American women non-fiction writers
Bon Appétit people
21st-century American women